Kutna may refer to:
 Kutna, India
 Kutna, Iran